Swelethu Madasa is a member of the Pan-African Parliament from South Africa.

References

Madasa, Zwelethu
Madasa, zwelethu
Year of birth missing (living people)
Place of birth missing (living people)